Caspar Bartholin the Younger (Latinized: Caspar Bartholin Secundus; 10 September 1655  – 11 June 1738), was a Danish anatomist who first described the "Bartholin's gland" in the 17th century. The discovery of the Bartholin's gland is sometimes mistakenly credited to his grandfather.

Early life and education
Bartholin was born in Copenhagen, Denmark. He came from an eminent family. He is the grandson of theologian and anatomist Caspar Bartholin the Elder (1585–1629) and son of physician, mathematician, and theologian Thomas Bartholin (1616–1680). His uncle was scientist and physician  Rasmus Bartholin (1625–1698).

Academic career

Bartholin started his medical studies in 1671 at the age of 16.
From 1674, he studied in the Netherlands, France and Italy.
When he returned to Denmark in 1677, he was appointed  lecturer of natural philosophy at the University of Copenhagen.
The following year he gained his medical degree and was made full professor at the University of Copenhagen.
He described the bartholin glands which bear his name in 1677. 
He was rector of the University of Copenhagen from 1687 to 1688.

In 1690 he left his academic career to become a high court judge, becoming Procurator General in 1719, and Deputy of Finance in 1724. In about 1696, Danish-born French anatomist Jacob B. Winslow (1669–1760) was Bartholin's prosector. He received the Order of Dannebrog in 1729.

Hagestedgård
Bartholin inherited the Hagestedgård manor house and estate at Holbæk from his father in 1680. He sold the estate to Laurits Jacobsen in 1686 but reacquired it in 1695. He then sold it, for a second time, to Ursula von Putbus in 1704.

Works 
 . Rome: B. Carrara, 1677 (Bartholin also wrote about music)
 . Amsterdam: J. H. Wetstein, 1678

References

1655 births
1738 deaths
People from Copenhagen
University of Copenhagen alumni
Academic staff of the University of Copenhagen
17th-century Danish scientists
18th-century Danish scientists
17th-century Danish landowners
18th-century Danish landowners
Danish anatomists
Scientists from Copenhagen
Bartholin family